Alitame is an aspartic acid-containing dipeptide sweetener. It was developed by Pfizer in the early 1980s and currently marketed in some countries under the brand name Aclame. Most dipeptides are not sweet, but the unexpected discovery of aspartame in 1965 led to a search for similar compounds that shared its sweetness.  Alitame is one such second-generation dipeptide sweetener.  Neotame, developed by the owners of the NutraSweet brand, is another.

Alitame is about 2000 times sweeter than sucrose (table sugar), about 10 times sweeter than aspartame, and has no aftertaste.  Its half-life under hot or acidic conditions is about twice as long as aspartame's, although some other artificial sweeteners, including saccharin and acesulfame potassium, are more stable yet.  Unlike aspartame, alitame does not contain phenylalanine, and can therefore be used by people with phenylketonuria.

Alitame has approved for use in Mexico, Australia, New Zealand and China.  
Danisco has withdrawn its petition for using alitame as a sweetening agent or flavoring in food in USA.

Sweeny also addresses a compound with a sweetness of 1200 x sucrose in his review, in  based on an NH-CH(cyclopropyl)tert-butyl (Ex 6). Ex 5, with NH-CH(cyclopropyl)2 is also 1200 x sucrose. These are good basis for 2nd class picks. Ex 16 is for Alitame proper. Although, in Ex 17, oxidation to the sulfonyl can reduce activity to 1000.

References

External links

Is Sucralose Keto Friendly?

Peptides
Sugar substitutes